Cruis'n World is the 1996 sequel to the 1994 arcade racer Cruis'n USA. Cruis'n World allows players to race on various tracks around the world. The game also features more cars than Cruis'n USA. This game introduced stunts to the Cruis'n series. They served to dodge obstacles, take close curves and so. If the stunt makes the vehicle fly in the air, the game gives the player extra seconds of time. The game also uses small rocket boosts to speed up.

The game was later released on the Nintendo 64 in 1998, being the best received of the Cruis'n ports.

Gameplay

Cruis'n World features the same core gameplay as its predecessor, in that the player races on different tracks under a time limit to reach the goal, passing checkpoints along the way to help extend this time limit. The races take place in different destinations around the world, such as Hawaii, Japan, Australia, China, Africa, Egypt, Moscow, Germany, Italy, France, England, Mexico,  New York City and Florida. The cars now have the ability to perform stunts during races such as wheelies, which give short speed bursts, and aerial flips, which deduct seconds from the final race time, allowing for the player to achieve a better position in the records' table. Should the player win all stages including Florida, the car would be taken by a Space Shuttle for a trip to the moon.

The Nintendo 64 version adds an extra track on the Moon, which is unlocked once the player reaches the end of the "Cruise the World" mode, and also features an exclusive Championship mode, in which players race on circuit tracks set in the game's different stages rather than the arcade's road tracks, competing for points which allow the player to unlock upgrades for the cars. The game supports up to four players using a split screen.

Development
The developers of this game sent artists on a round-the-world trip to digitally capture sights and major tourist attractions.

The development of the Nintendo 64 version started in 1996 after the development of the Nintendo 64 version of Cruis'n USA. Eugene Jarvis had admitted that the Cruis'n USA port was not good, so they promised the game to be an arcade perfect port. Eurocom took the Cruis'n license and decided to spend more time on the game than in Cruis'n USA. In early 1997, Nintendo announced that Cruis'n World would be coming to the Nintendo 64 in the fall, but the game was silently delayed until 1998.

Reception

The game was displayed at the 1996 AMOA show, where it won the award for Most Innovative New Title. Electronic Gaming Monthly named it a runner-up for Arcade Game of the Year. A Next Generation critic commented that, like Cruis'n USA, Cruis'n World has an unsurpassed sense of arcade-style driving, saying that the players can drive fast, knock the cars of the road and get into chaotic multi-car collisions. At the same time, he found this a shortcoming, since the game is very quickly mastered. He praised the track design as being more elaborate and requiring more skill than its predecessor, but said the pop-in remains as bad as before.

The Nintendo 64 port was met with mixed reception, as GameRankings gave it a score of 62.76%.

Next Generation reviewed the Nintendo 64 version of the game, rating it two stars out of five, criticising the game having minimal technique and difficulty.

References

External links
Cruis'n World at Eurocom

1996 video games
Arcade video games
Assembly language software
Midway video games
Nintendo 64 games
Cruis'n
Video games developed in the United Kingdom
Video games developed in the United States
Video games with digitized sprites
Video games set in 1996
Video games set in Australia
Video games set in China
Video games set in Egypt
Video games set in England
Video games set in France
Video games set in Germany
Video games set in Hawaii
Video games set in Italy
Video games set in Japan
Video games set in Kenya
Video games set in New York City
Video games set in Mexico
Video games set in Russia
Video games set in the United States
Eurocom games
Multiplayer and single-player video games
Cultural depictions of Bill Clinton
NASA in fiction